Pteralyxia laurifolia, the ridged pteralyxia, is a species of plant in the family Apocynaceae. It is endemic to the Island of Oahu in the Hawaiian Islands.  The species is listed as vulnerable, threatened by habitat loss.

References

laurifolia
Endemic flora of Hawaii
Biota of Oahu
Trees of Hawaii
Taxobox binomials not recognized by IUCN